Klejdi Rapo (born 18 June 1994) is an Albanian professional footballer who  plays as a midfielder for Albanian club Laçi.Partizani mendon dhe për ekipin tjetër, të kuqtë “gërrmojnë” për dy emra në Kategorinë e Dytë

References

External links

1994 births
Living people
People from Korçë County
People from Korçë
Sportspeople from Korçë
Footballers from Korçë
Albanian footballers
Association football midfielders
KF Skënderbeu Korçë players
Bilisht Sport players
KS Pogradeci players
KF Maliqi players
KF Laçi players
Kategoria Superiore players
Kategoria e Parë players
Kategoria e Dytë players